Hello Tomorrow! is an American science fiction comedy-drama television series that premiered on Apple TV+ on February 17, 2023. It stars Billy Crudup.

Plot
In a retrofuturistic world, a group of traveling salesmen try to sell timeshares on the moon.

Cast

Main
 Billy Crudup as Jack Billings
 Hank Azaria as Eddie
 Haneefah Wood as Shirley Stedman
 Alison Pill as Myrtle Mayburn
 Nicholas Podany as Joey Shorter
 Dewshane Williams as Herb Porter

Recurring
 Jacki Weaver as Barbara Billings
 Dagmara Domińczyk as Elle
 Michael Paul Chan as Walt
 Matthew Maher as Lester Costopolous

Guest
 Michael Harney as Sal
 Frankie Faison as Buck Manzell
 W. Earl Brown as Big Fred
 Gabriel Ebert as Marvin Mayburn
 Susan Heyward as Betty Porter

Episodes

Production 

On May 6, 2021, it was announced that Apple TV+ would produce Amit Bhalla's and Lucas Jansen's TV series Hello Tomorrow!, with Bhalla and Jansen co-writing and producing with Blake Griffin, Ryan Kalil, and Noah Weinstein's Mortal Media, Billy Crudup, and Jonathan Entwistle, with Entwistle set to direct the 10-episode series. Crudup would appear in the lead role. 

On October 25, 2021, Hank Azaria, Haneefah Wood, Alison Pill, Nicholas Podany, and Dewshane Williams joined the cast, as did Jacki Weaver on November 17. On January 24, 2022, Dagmara Domińczyk received a recurring role.

Filming began in New York City on October 14, 2021, and concluded on March 24, 2022.

The series premiered on February 17, 2023 on Apple TV+.

Reception
	
The review aggregation website Rotten Tomatoes reported a 57% approval rating based on 44 reviews, with an average rating of 6.10/10. The website's critical consensus states, "Hello Tomorrow! is visually striking enough to periodically distract from its rambling story and thinly sketched characters, but overall, this first season fails to live up to its potential." Metacritic, which uses a weighted average, assigned a score of 60 out of 100 based on 24 critics, indicating "Mixed or average reviews".

References

External links
 Hello Tomorrow! on Apple TV+
 

Apple TV+ original programming
2020s American comedy-drama television series
2020s American science fiction television series
English-language television shows
2023 American television series debuts
Television series by Media Rights Capital
Retrofuturism